Gonoreta is a genus of moths first described by Warren in 1902. It is in the subfamily Drepaninae.

Some species are known as defoliators of coffee plants (Rubiaceae).

Type species: Gonoreta ansorgei Warren, 1902

Some species of this genus are

 Gonoreta albiapex Watson, 1965
 Gonoreta angulosa Watson, 1965
 Gonoreta bispina Watson, 1965
 Gonoreta contracta (Warren, 1897)
 Gonoreta cymba Watson, 1965
 Gonoreta differenciata (Bryk, 1913)
 Gonoreta forcipulata Watson, 1965
 Gonoreta gonioptera (Hampson, 1914)
 Gonoreta opacifinis Watson, 1965
 Gonoreta subtilis (Bryk, 1913)

References

Drepaninae
Drepanidae genera